Onamia is a city in Mille Lacs County, Minnesota, United States. The population was 878 at the 2010 census. U.S. Highway 169 and Minnesota State Highway 27 are the main routes in the community.

History
Originally, the city of Onamia was organized from the merger of two communities, Village of Onamia (Ojibwe: Onamanii-zaaga'iganiing) and the Village of Ericksonville (Ojibwe: Gibaakwa'igaansing). Onamia is named after Lake Onamia, of which "Onamia" is derived from the Ojibwe word onaman meaning "red ochre", or locally as "vermilion". Ericksonville was incorporated in 1898. Onamia was incorporated in 1908.

Geography
Onamia is three miles south of Mille Lacs Lake.

Mille Lacs Kathio State Park is located just west of the city. Sections of the Rum River State Forest are located nearby.

Demographics

2010 census
As of the census of 2010, there were 878 people, 349 households, and 167 families living in the city. The racial makeup of the city was 83.0% White, 2.3% African American, 9.9% Native American, 0.7% Asian, 0.3% from other races, and 3.8% from two or more races. Hispanic or Latino of any race were 1.7% of the population.

There were 349 households, of which 26.9% had children under the age of 18 living with them, 26.9% were married couples living together, 14.9% had a female householder with no husband present, 6.0% had a male householder with no wife present, and 52.1% were non-families. 46.4% of all households were made up of individuals, and 26.7% had someone living alone who was 65 years of age or older. The average household size was 2.07 and the average family size was 2.84.

The median age in the city was 41.7 years. 28% of residents were under the age of 18; 9.4% were between the ages of 18 and 24; 15.3% were from 25 to 44; 22.7% were from 45 to 64; and 24.7% were 65 years of age or older. The gender makeup of the city was 53.4% male and 46.6% female.

2000 census
As of the census of 2000, there were 847 people, 318 households, and 171 families living in the city. The racial makeup of the city was 90.20% White, 0.94% African American, 6.49% Native American, 0.24% from other races, and 2.13% from two or more races. Hispanic or Latino of any race were 1.18% of the population.

There were 318 households, out of which 26.4% had children under the age of 18 living with them, 38.1% were married couples living together, 12.3% had a female householder with no husband present, and 46.2% were non-families. 42.8% of all households were made up of individuals, and 23.9% had someone living alone who was 65 years of age or older.  The average household size was 2.16 and the average family size was 2.98.

In the city, the population was spread out, with 28.5% under the age of 18, 7.8% from 18 to 24, 18.8% from 25 to 44, 18.8% from 45 to 64, and 26.2% who were 65 years of age or older.  The median age was 41 years. For every 100 females, there were 90.8 males.  For every 100 females age 18 and over, there were 77.7 males.

The median income for a household in the city was $21,250, and the median income for a family was $32,500. Males had a median income of $31,000 versus $19,375 for females. The per capita income for the city was $12,857.  About 11.9% of families and 14.6% of the population were below the poverty line, including 18.0% of those under age 18 and 7.3% of those age 65 or over.

Education
The public school system is Onamia Public Schools.

The Nay Ah Shing School, a K-12 tribal school, operates its secondary school and the Abinoojiiyag School (a primary school facility) in a nearby unincorporated area.

Notable people
 Shane Bauer - author

References

External links
Mille Lacs Messenger - newspaper site serving Onamia, Minnesota
Onamia Area Website - Link
Mille Lacs Area Tourism Council website - resource for all your Mille Lacs Area information

Cities in Mille Lacs County, Minnesota
Cities in Minnesota